Sakka Podu Podu Raja is a 1978 Indian Tamil-language film directed by S. P. Muthuraman, starring Jaishankar and Jayachitra. Kamal Haasan and Fatafat Jayalaxmi played guest roles. The film was hit at the box office.

Plot

Cast 
Jaishankar
Jayachitra
Kamal Haasan – Special appearance
Phataphat Jayalaxmi – Special appearance
Manorama
Cho Ramaswamy
Major Sundarrajan
S. A. Ashokan
Srikanth
Thengai Srinivasan
K. A. Thangavelu
Vennira Aadai Moorthy
Suruli Rajan
Shanmugasundari

Soundtrack 
The music was composed by Shankar–Ganesh.

References

External links 
 

1970s Tamil-language films
1978 films
Films directed by S. P. Muthuraman
Films scored by Shankar–Ganesh
Films with screenplays by Panchu Arunachalam